General Sir George Henry Frederick Berkeley KCB (9 July 1785 – 25 September 1857) was a British Army officer and Conservative politician.

Military career
Berkeley was the eldest son of Admiral Sir George Cranfield Berkeley, third son of Augustus Berkeley, 4th Earl of Berkeley. His mother was Lady Emilia Charlotte, daughter of Lord George Lennox.

At the start of the Waterloo Campaign of 1815, he was the Duke of Wellington's liaison officer at the Prince of Orange's headquarters. He was also created KCB in 1815. He became Commander-in-Chief of the Madras Army in 1848 and Surveyor-General of the Ordnance in 1852.

He was given the colonelcy of the 81st Regiment of Foot in 1844, transferring in 1845 to the 35th Regiment of Foot, a position he held until his death. He was promoted full general on 20 June 1854.

Political career
Berkeley was returned to Parliament for Devonport in 1852, a seat he held until 1857.

Family
Berkeley died in September 1857, aged 72.

He had married Lucy, daughter of Sir Thomas Sutton, 1st Baronet, in 1815. They had three sons and one daughter. His third son, George, succeeded as 7th Earl of Berkeley in 1882. Lady Berkeley died in February 1870.

Notes

References

External links 
 

 

|-

|-

|-

|-

1785 births
1857 deaths
Knights Commander of the Order of the Bath
British Army generals
UK MPs 1852–1857
Conservative Party (UK) MPs for English constituencies
George
Recipients of the Waterloo Medal